The Iloilo–Guimaras–Negros–Cebu Link Bridge is a planned network of bridges in the Visayas in the Philippines connecting the islands of Panay, Guimaras, Negros, and Cebu.

One of the core projects of the Duterte Administration's "Build, Build, Build" Program, the bridge network aims to provide increased inter-connectivity in the provinces of Western and Central Visayas, to stimulate economic activity in the region and help in the decongestion of Metro Manila in the process. Considering the width of the Iloilo Strait, Guimaras Strait, and Tañon Strait, each bridge in the network, if completed, will be much longer than the longest bridge in the country, the 2-km San Juanico Bridge between the islands of Samar and Leyte.

History
There were several proposals to build bridges linking the islands in Visayas. The Department of Public Works and Highways conducted a study on building bridges that would connect Panay, Guimaras, and Negros which were projected to require a  budget if the bridges are to be built.

In 2013, Governors Arthur Defensor Sr. of Iloilo and Alfredo Marañón Jr. of Negros Occidental made an alternative proposal that would bypass Guimaras and directly link Banate (in Iloilo) and E.B. Magalona (in Negros Occidental) via a  bridge.

A feasibility study conducted by the Philippine government that concluded in May 2018 divided the project into three phases: Phase I would start in Leganes, Iloilo and go to Buenavista, Guimaras; Phase II will be the Guimaras–Negros portion; while Phase III the Negros–Cebu part. Public Works and Highways secretary Mark Villar announced in August 2018 that Phase I of the project will likely start in early 2019, with the ₱27.156 million needed for the project to be provided by the Chinese government through a grant. This proposal did not actualize and the local Philippine governments are now negotiating an alternative proposal from South Korean interests.

See also

References

Proposed bridges in the Philippines